The Madhanur is a revenue block in the Tirupattur district of Tamil Nadu, India. It has a total of 36 panchayat villages, and one town, Ambur.

Palaiyam 

 

Revenue blocks of Vellore district